Paul Herbert may refer to:
Paul M. Herbert (1889–1983), American politician, Lieutenant Governor of Ohio
Paul Herbert (athlete) (born 1964), British middle-distance runner
Paul Herbert (golfer) in Lord Derby's Young Professionals' Tournament

See also
Paul Hebert (disambiguation)